Beaverton Crossroads is an unincorporated community in Boone County, Illinois, United States. Beaverton Crossroads is north of Poplar Grove.

References

Unincorporated communities in Boone County, Illinois
Unincorporated communities in Illinois